Kucheri (also Romanized as Kūcherī, Koochari, and Kūcharī; also known as Kocherī) is a village in Kenarrudkhaneh Rural District, in the Central District of Golpayegan County, Isfahan Province, Iran. At the 2006 census, its population was 317, in 124 families.

References 

Populated places in Golpayegan County